In a construction puzzle you have to build (assemble) a technical contraption. This may be a static object (such as a bridge) or a mechanical object (like a machine).

In a wider sense a construction puzzle is any puzzle where you have to assemble a given set of pieces in a certain way. Examples for these types of construction puzzles are the stick puzzles, many tiling puzzles and also some mechanical puzzles.

Types of construction puzzles

some mechanical puzzles are construction puzzles.
some packing problems can be seen as construction puzzles.
stick puzzles is a sub-type of construction puzzles.
some tiling puzzles can be seen as construction puzzles.
others

Examples
Armadillo Run
Bridge Builder 2
Crazy Machines
Crazy Machines 2
Elefunk
The Incredible Machine
Pipe Mania
World of Goo

Puzzles
Puzzle video games